Merzenich is a railway station situated at Merzenich, Kreis Düren in the German state of North Rhine-Westphalia on the Cologne–Aachen railway. It opened on 29 April 2003 with the S-Bahn tracks. It has an island platform and a large commuter parking area.

It is served by Rhine-Ruhr S-Bahn lines S13 between Sindorf or Düren and Troisdorf and by S19 between Düren and Hennef (Sieg), Blankenberg (Sieg), Herchen or Au (Sieg). Together these provide two services an hour to Cologne on weekdays and Saturdays and once an hour on Sundays and public holidays. It is classified by Deutsche Bahn as a category 5 station.

References 

S13 (Rhine-Ruhr S-Bahn)
Rhine-Ruhr S-Bahn stations
Railway stations in Germany opened in 2003
Buildings and structures in Düren (district)